Motivation, Agency, and Public Policy is a non-fiction book written by the economist Julian Le Grand. The book, which argues in favor of increasing tax choice, was described by The Economist as "accessible – and profound" and by The Times as "one of the most stimulating books on public policy in recent years".

Overview
In his book, Le Grand explores ways of increasing the amount of choice and competition in the public sector. This quasi-market would transform citizens from pawns to queens and "improve quality and value for money". Specific policy recommendations include "demogrants" and hypothecation (earmarking).

Criticism
One criticism is that Le Grand's argument only has limited appeal. "Le Grand’s argument does not speak to libertarians; rejecting the welfare state, they part from him long before he calls on them to cheer for transforming service users into queens. Nor does his argument entice liberal egalitarians."

See also
 Scroogenomics
 The Other Invisible Hand

References

External links
 Le Grand, Julian – Motivation, Agency, and Public Policy: Of Knights and Knaves, Pawns and Queens 2003.

Books about economic policy
2003 non-fiction books
Oxford University Press books